Airospermeae is a tribe of flowering plants in the family Rubiaceae and contains 7 species in 2 genera. Its representatives are found in New Guinea, Fiji, the Lesser Sunda Islands, the Philippines, and Sumatra.

Genera 
Currently accepted names
 Airosperma K.Schum. & Lauterb. - New Guinea, Fiji
 Boholia Merr. - the Lesser Sunda Islands, the Philippines, Sumatra

Synonyms
 Abramsia Gillespie = Airosperma

References 

 
Ixoroideae tribes